Round Prairie Township is a township in Jefferson County, Iowa, USA.

A 101-acre Round Prairie Park in the township has been developed by the Jefferson County Conservation Board. It has a campground, fishing ponds, and a mix of prairie and timber landscapes.

The 275-acre Cedar Creek Timber & Wetland near the township offers hiking, bird watching, observing nature, hunting and fishing.

References

Townships in Jefferson County, Iowa
Townships in Iowa